The Anchorage Memorial Park, also known as Anchorage Cemetery, is a  cemetery located in Anchorage, Alaska, United States.  Covering nine city blocks, the cemetery separates the city's downtown and Fairview neighborhoods.

The cemetery was established by President Woodrow Wilson in 1915 as part of the Anchorage townsite, one of a number of land reserves set aside for public facilities for the new town.  It was listed on the National Register of Historic Places in 1993, recognizing its status as Anchorage's oldest cemetery.

From approximately 1954 to 1986, a public housing complex called Willow Park occupied the half-blocks of the cemetery site adjacent to Ninth Avenue and Fairbanks Street.  The buildings were razed to allow for expansion of the cemetery.  All that remains is the complex's maintenance building, taken over for the same purpose by the cemetery.

Notable burials
 Anthony Joseph Dimond (1881–1953), US Congressman
 Lorene Harrison (1905–2005), Artist and educator
 Walter Joseph Hickel (1919–2010), US Cabinet Secretary and Alaska Governor. Buried standing up
 Ada Blackjack (1898–1983), Explorer
 Sydney Laurence (1865–1940), Artist
 Howard Wallace Pollock (1920–2011), US Congressman
 Mary Louise Rasmuson (1911–2012), Fifth Director of the US Army Women's Army Corps
 William Alex Stolt (1900–2001), Anchorage Mayor

See also
 Angelus Memorial Park, a private cemetery near the Seward Highway in south Anchorage, of similar stature in the community to this cemetery
 List of cemeteries in Alaska
 National Register of Historic Places listings in Anchorage, Alaska

References

1915 establishments in Alaska
Cemeteries on the National Register of Historic Places in Alaska
Buildings and structures on the National Register of Historic Places in Anchorage, Alaska
Historic districts on the National Register of Historic Places in Alaska
Cemeteries established in the 1910s